FABM may refer to:
 Trans-2-decenoyl-(acyl-carrier protein) isomerase, an enzyme
 Bethlehem Airport, ICAO code